Bernd Baumgart (born 3 July 1955) is a German rower who competed for East Germany in the 1976 Summer Olympics.

He was born in Wittenberg. In 1976, he was a crew member of the East German boat, which won the gold medal in the men's eight event.

References

1955 births
Living people
People from Wittenberg
People from Bezirk Halle
East German male rowers
Sportspeople from Saxony-Anhalt
Olympic rowers of East Germany
Rowers at the 1976 Summer Olympics
Olympic gold medalists for East Germany
Olympic medalists in rowing
Medalists at the 1976 Summer Olympics
Recipients of the Patriotic Order of Merit in silver